Korobovshchina is a rural locality (a selo) in Razdolyevskoye Rural Settlement, Kolchuginsky District, Vladimir Oblast, Russia. The population was 16 as of 2010. There are 13 streets.

Geography 
Korobovshchina is located 22 km southwest of Kolchugino (the district's administrative centre) by road. Beryozovaya Roshcha is the nearest rural locality.

References 

Rural localities in Kolchuginsky District